Sellita (Sellita Watch Co. SA) is a Swiss manufacturer of mechanical watch movements based in La Chaux-de-Fonds in the canton of Neuchâtel. Founded in 1950, Sellita operated as one of ETA's major outsourced assembly company for their movements until 2003. Since then, it has been developing its own movements based on ETA calibers with expired patent rights and has managed to become one of the main movement manufacturers of the Swiss watchmaking industry.

Movements 

Hublot, IWC, Lilienthal Berlin, Oris, Raymond Weil, Sinn, and TAG Heuer are among the brands that utilize Sellita's movements or slightly modified versions to power their watches.

 SW 200/215/400 (based on ETA 2824-2 and ETA 2836-2)
 SW 300/1000 (based on ETA 2892-2)
 SW 500/510/600 (based on Valjoux 7750 a.k.a. ETA 7750)

References 

Watch movement manufacturers
Manufacturing companies of Switzerland